Yahdunlim (or Yakhdunlim, Yahdun-Lim) was the king of Mari probably in 1820—1796 BC. He was of Amorite origin, and became king after the death of his father Iagitlim. Yahdunlim built Mari up to become one of the major powers of the region. He led a successful campaign to the coast of the Mediterranean.

Reign 

Yahdun-Lim started his reign by subduing seven of his rebelling tribal leaders, and rebuilding the walls of Mari and Terqa in addition to building a new fort which he named Dur-Yahdun-Lim. 

Yahdun-Lim's kingdom was threatened by incursions from various nomad tribes, such as the Canaanites, but he was able to subjugate them and force them to pay tribute. After having established internal peace, he built a temple to the god Shamash.

He then expanded west and claimed to have reached the Mediterranean, however he later had to face a rebellion by the Banu-Yamina nomads who were centered at Tuttul, and the rebels were supported by Yamhad's king Sumu-Epuh, whose interests were threatened by the recently established alliance between Yahdun-Lim and Eshnunna. Yahdun-Lim defeated the Yamina but an open war with Yamhad was avoided.

Shamshi-Adad I 
Yahdun-Lim then became occupied by his rivalry with Shamshi-Adad I of Shubat-Enlil, the son of the late Ila-kabkabu. 

He received pleas for help from kings threatened by Shamshi-Adad's expansionist plans. But before Yahdunlim could move against Shamshi-Adad, he was assassinated in c. 1798 BC by his possible son Sumu-Yamam, who himself got assassinated two years after ascending the throne.

But according to William J. Hamblin, Yahdun-Lim was killed in a battle with Shamshi-Adad ca 1796 BC. Shamshi-Adad then assigned his son Yasmah-Addu to the lordship of Mari.

In the chaos that followed, Shamshi-Adad Shamshi-Adad advanced and annexed Mari. The war ended in a defeat for Mari.

Zimrilim, Yakhdunlim's son and heir, was forced to flee to Aleppo, where he would remain as an exile until Shamshi-Adad's death.

Yahdul-Lim of Carchemish may also be sometimes referred to as Yahdun-Lim.

See also 
 Royal Palace of Mari

Notes

Literature 
 
 
 
 
 
 
 

Amorite kings
Kings of Mari
19th-century BC rulers
19th-century BC people